Van Elle is a piling and rail infrastructure company based in Nottinghamshire, between Pinxton and Kirkby-in-Ashfield, in the United Kingdom. It is listed on the sub market of the London Stock Exchange AIM.

History
The company was founded in 1984, by structural engineer Michael Ellis. In the year to 30 April 2015, Van Elle’s turnover rose 57% from 2014's £46m to £72.5m for the year to April 2015. Profit more than tripled, from £2.8m to £9m, and headcount grew from around 300 to over 400.

In October 2016, the company was floated on the AIM sub market of the London Stock Exchange, achieving a market capitalisation of £80m. Van Elle was forecasting revenues for 2016 approaching £85m. 

Ellis retired the following December, but remained a shareholder in the company. In 2017, delays in rail projects caused turnover to drop. In November 2017, Ellis started an attempt to remove the company's chief executive Jon Fenton and a senior independent director, Robin Williams, citing concerns about the company's management, departures of key staff and financial forecasts. 

During the dispute, the company faced questions after it wrote off more than £330,000 of work building a new house for Fenton (who announced he would be stepping down from the company due to a family illness), while Ellis accused Van Elle directors of making personal attacks ahead of a shareholders' vote in December on returning him to the board. The board rebutted Ellis's criticism, accusing him of damaging the company. 

At the shareholders meeting, Ellis's bid to return to the board was rejected. In January 2018, the company warned it would potentially lose £1.6 million as a result of the collapse of Carillion, for whom it was working as a subcontractor on projects for Network Rail. Van Elle also reported uncertainty relating to £2.5m worth of future work for Network Rail, with a potential impact on future financial results. 

Interim results for the year to 31 October 2017, showed the firm made an underlying pre tax profit of £5.4m on turnover of £52.6m. In January 2019, Van Elle reported pretax profits down 54% to £2.4m as turnover fell 18% to £42.9m in the six months to 31 October 2018, with its CEO blaming Carillion's collapse for the profit slump. Two further profit warnings followed as its share-price halved ahead of its annual results announcement in July 2019. 

Results for the year to 30 April 2019 showed a 56.5% fall in pre tax profits (to £4m from £9.2m) as turnover dropped from £103.9m to £88.5m; during the year, the company's share price fell from 82p to 35p, valuing the company at £29m. The 2020-2021 COVID-19 pandemic caused Van Elle to declare a loss of £700,000 for the six months to 31 October 2020, with revenues down over 20% to £38.3m. In the  year to April 2021, the firm reported a pre-tax loss of £1.4m, following its £2.2m loss in 2019, with revenues stable at £84m. However, the company returned to profitability in the half year to October 2021.

References

1984 establishments in England
Construction and civil engineering companies of the United Kingdom
Companies based in Nottinghamshire
Construction and civil engineering companies established in 1984
British companies established in 1984